The 1979 Greenlandic Men's Football Championship was the 9th edition of the Greenlandic Men's Football Championship. The final round was held in Aasiaat. It was won after extra time by CIF-70 Qasigiannguit who defeated Siumut Amerdlok Kunuk 2–1 in the final.

See also
Football in Greenland
Football Association of Greenland
Greenland national football team
Greenlandic Men's Football Championship

References

Greenlandic Men's Football Championship seasons
Green
Green
Foot